Mustafa Elitaş (5 January 1957, Kayseri) is a Turkish politician who served as the Economy Minister of Turkey from 24 November 2015 to 24 November 2016.

Elitaş graduated from the Department of Economics and Public Finance of Ankara University in 1981. He serves as a Member of Parliament for the electoral district of Kayseri since November 2015, having previously served between 2002 and June 2015. He was appointed as new Economy Minister for the Republic of Turkey on 24 November 2015 by Prime Minister Ahmet Davutoğlu.

References

1957 births
Living people
Deputies of Kayseri
Justice and Development Party (Turkey) politicians
Members of the 23rd Parliament of Turkey
Members of the 22nd Parliament of Turkey
Members of the 24th Parliament of Turkey
Members of the 26th Parliament of Turkey
Members of the 64th government of Turkey
Ankara University alumni
Ministers of Economic Affairs of Turkey